Wilhelm of Sweden may refer to:

 Prince Wilhelm, Duke of Södermanland (1884–1965), a real-life Swedish prince
 Prince Wilhelm of Sweden, a fictional character from the Netflix series Young Royals